Lophognathus maculilabris is a species of agama found in Indonesia.

References

Lophognathus
Taxa named by George Albert Boulenger
Reptiles described in 1883